Florence Freida Arenberg (May 25, 1907 – May 31, 1995) was an American botanist and biology educator, based in Chicago. Her standard author abbreviation in botanical contexts is Arenb.

Early life and education 
Arenberg was born in Chicago, the daughter of Meyer Isidor Arenberg and Rebecca Arenberg. Her parents were both Jewish immigrants from Lithuania, then part of the Russian Empire. Her mother died in 1914, and she was raised in part by her stepmother, Tillie Silberman Arenberg. She trained as a teacher at the Chicago Normal College, graduating in 1926, and earned a master's degree in botany at the University of Wyoming, with a thesis titled "The Agaricaceae from the Medicine Bow Mountains of Wyoming" (1939).

Career 
In the 1940s, Arenberg was secretary of the Chicago Biology Round Table, and a member of the Mycological Society of America (MSA). She and MSA president Alexander H. Smith of the University of Michigan were credited with first describing the fungus Strobilurus wyomingensis. 

Arenberg was also active in Jewish community groups in Chicago. She was president of the HIAS (Hebrew Immigrant Aid Society) Juniors in Chicago. She traveled to Israel in 1950, and lectured about it on her return. In the 1950s, Arenberg was principal of the religious school at Temple Beth Israel. She taught at Lane Technical High School in the 1960s. In 1960, she was awarded a grant from the Chicago Heart Association, to study animal ecology in a summer course at Penn State.

Personal life 
Arenberg made headlines in 1928, when she made a makeshift tourniquet to save a man with a severe wrist injury. She died in 1995, aged 88 years.

References 

1907 births
1995 deaths
Scientists from Chicago
Chicago State University alumni
University of Wyoming alumni
20th-century American educators
American mycologists
20th-century American botanists
20th-century American women scientists
American women educators
American women botanists
Women mycologists
American people of Lithuanian-Jewish descent
Jewish American scientists
Jewish women scientists
20th-century American Jews